Typhoon Halong, known in the Philippines as Typhoon Inday, passed just south of Guam one week after Typhoon Chataan struck the island and left heavy damage. The seventh named storm of the season, Halong developed near the same location as Chataan on July 5 near the Marshall Islands. For much of its duration, the storm moved toward the northwest, gradually intensifying. Early on July 10, Halong passed just south of Guam as a tropical storm, producing high waves and gusty winds on the island. The storm disrupted relief efforts from Chataan, causing additional power outages but little damage.

After affecting Guam, Halong quickly strengthened and reached its peak winds on July 12. Subsequently, the typhoon weakened greatly while curving to the northeast, although it still passed near Okinawa with strong winds that left widespread power outages. Halong struck southeastern Japan, dropping heavy rainfall and producing strong winds that left $89.8 million (¥10.3 billion 2002 JPY) in damage. There was one death in the country and nine injuries. Halong became extratropical on July 16 and dissipated the next day. The typhoon influenced the monsoon trough in the Philippines, contributing to flooding and deaths in the country.

Meteorological history

In early July, a circulation with an area of convection developed along the monsoon trough near Enewetak Atoll. The system remained nearly stationary, tracking slowly to the southwest. Gradually organizing, the system developed into a tropical depression on July 6 over the Marshall Islands. Without having issued a tropical cyclone formation alert, the Joint Typhoon Warning Center (JTWC) initiated advisories on Tropical Depression 10W at 0000 UTC on July 7. Late that day, the Japan Meteorological Agency (JMA)  upgraded the depression to Tropical Storm Halong near the island of Chuuk in the Federated States of Micronesia. By that time, the storm was moving west-northwestward, steered by a ridge to the north. Halong slowly intensified, although it continued to develop deep convection that wrapped into the center. Early on July 9, the JMA upgraded the storm to a severe tropical storm.

While moving toward Guam, Halong became better organized, developing an eye and well-defined rainbands. An approaching trough increased shear over Halong, and a weak ridge to the north restricted outflow; this briefly prevented significant intensification after the convection decreased. Late on July 11, the thunderstorms increased, and restrengthening resumed. Around that time, the typhoon entered the area of the Philippine Atmospheric, Geophysical and Astronomical Services Administration (PAGASA), which gave it the local name Typhoon Inday. Early on July 13, the JTWC upgraded Halong to a super typhoon after the storm developed a well-defined eye  in diameter.

It was continuing to the northwest toward Okinawa, and threatened to strike the island at near peak intensity. However, the typhoon began rapidly weakening due to increasing wind shear, and the eye quickly deteriorated. Around that time, the typhoon moved through a weakness in the ridge, turning to the north and later accelerating to the northeast. The combination of cool, dry air, and the persistent wind shear removed the convection from the center by early on July 15, weakening Halong to tropical storm status. Later that day, the JTWC discontinued advisories while the storm was approaching Japan, and the agency classified Halong as extratropical. The JMA continued tracking the storm, and Halong struck both the Izu and Bōsō peninsulas along Honshu. Late on July 16, the JMA classified Halong as extratropical, and shortly thereafter the storm dissipated over the Kuril Islands. The extratropical remnants of Halong moved out of the basin late on July 19, just prior dissipating.

Preparations and impact

Only a week after Typhoon Chataan struck Guam and left $60 million in damage, Typhoon Halong also threatened the island, although it veered to the south in the day before it would have struck. Due to the storm, all flights were canceled in Guam and the Northern Marianas Islands, and officials advised residents in low-lying areas to evacuate. The waves left beach erosion along Guam's southern coast, and were higher than during Chataan's passage. Damage on the island was estimated at $40,000. The storm disrupted work to repair damage from Chataan. Portions of the island, including Guam Memorial Hospital, had their power restored after Chataan, only to lose electricity during Halong. The additional damage caused by Halong contributed to Governor Carl T.C. Gutierrez declaring the island as a state of emergency on July 22, which activated the Guam National Guard.

While passing northeast of the Philippines, Halong enhanced the monsoon, and combined with the effects from previous typhoons Rammasun and Chataan, as well as Severe Tropical Storm Nakri, there were 85 deaths, with 45 people injured in the Philippines. About ten of the deaths were estimated to have been caused by Halong. The combined damage in the country totaled $10.3 million (₱522 million 2002 PHP).

In the Ryukyu Islands of Japan, including Okinawa, Halong left more than 48,800 houses without power due to the strong winds. Officials canceled bus service in Naze, Kagoshima during the storm. Throughout the country, the typhoon destroyed six houses and damaged 223 others to varying degrees. Halong also flooded 301 houses, forcing about 4,000 people to evacuate their homes, many along rivers. Officials canceled 54 airline flights, 10 of them international, and due to the storm, 171 schools were closed. In Sendai, Halong damaged roads in 550 locations and railroads in seven locations. Nine levees were breached, and there were at least 270 landslides. Damage totaled $89.8 million (¥10.3 billion 2002 JPY) across the country, mostly from agriculture. During its passage, the typhoon injured nine people, one of them severely, and there was one death.

See also

 Tropical cyclones in 2002
 Other systems named Halong
 Typhoon Neoguri (2014)

Notes

References

External links

JMA General Information of Typhoon Halong (0207) from Digital Typhoon
JMA Best Track Data of Typhoon Halong (0207) 
JMA Best Track Data (Graphics) of Typhoon Halong (0207)
JMA Best Track Data (Text)
JTWC Best Track Data of Super Typhoon 10W (Halong)
10W.HALONG from the U.S. Naval Research Laboratory

2002 Pacific typhoon season
Typhoons in Guam
Typhoons in the Philippines
Typhoons in Japan
Typhoons
Halong